Elsie Fisher (born April 3, 2003) is an American actress. She is known for her starring role in Bo Burnham's comedy-drama film Eighth Grade (2018), for which she earned a nomination for the Golden Globe Award for Best Actress – Motion Picture Comedy or Musical. Fisher is also known for voicing animated characters such as Agnes in Despicable Me (2010) and Despicable Me 2 (2013), Masha in Masha and the Bear (2009–2012) and Parker Needler in The Addams Family (2019).

Life and career 
Fisher was born in Riverside, California, on April 3, 2003.

She began her career at age six, appearing in a 2009 episode of the NBC supernatural drama series Medium. From 2009 to 2012, she voiced Masha for the English dub of the Russian animated children's series Masha and the Bear. Fisher gained further recognition for voicing Agnes in the animated comedy film Despicable Me (2010) and its sequel Despicable Me 2 (2013). However, she did not participate in the third film in the series. Fisher appeared in a supporting role in the sports drama film McFarland, USA, which was released in February 2015. She had appeared in over sixteen national commercials by March 2016.

In 2018, Fisher received critical acclaim for her performance as socially-struggling teenage girl Kayla Day in the comedy-drama film Eighth Grade, the directorial debut of comedian Bo Burnham. For her performance, Fisher earned numerous accolades, including a Golden Globe Award nomination for Best Actress – Motion Picture Comedy or Musical. After filming Eighth Grade, she went into high school and didn't get cast in her high school play. She went on to voice Parker Needler in the animated dark comedy film The Addams Family in 2019. That same year, she appeared in the main role of Joy Wilkes, daughter of Annie Wilkes, in the second season of the Hulu anthology horror series Castle Rock.

In 2022, Fisher joined the cast of HBO dark comedy series Barry in its third season.

Filmography

Film

Television

Web

Awards and nominations

References

External links 

2003 births
American child actresses
American film actresses
American television actresses
American voice actresses
Actresses from Riverside, California
Living people
21st-century American women